Timothy Harley Macindoe (born 1961) is a New Zealand politician who was elected as a Member of Parliament in 2008 for the Hamilton West electorate. Macindoe previously served as the Minister of Customs in the Fifth National Government.

Early life
Macindoe was born in Auckland New Zealand where he was a boarder at King's College and later attended Otago University, where he studied for a BA (Hons) in History. Macindoe was a secondary teacher for 17 years, including six years as Deputy Principal at St. Peter's School, Cambridge. He has also held roles in retail, agriculture and as a prison tutor.

In 2009, Macindoe completed his second degree; an LLB from the University of Waikato.

Immediately prior to his election, he was Chief Executive of the Music and Art Waikato Trust (Arts Waikato), based in Hamilton.

Political career
In , Macindoe unsuccessfully stood for United New Zealand  in the Karapiro electorate. He also unsuccessfully stood for the National Party in 1999, 2002, and 2005, for which he was ranked 52nd, 39th, and 62nd respectively.

Macindoe held numerous roles within the New Zealand National Party, including Chairman of the Hamilton West electorate and four years as deputy chair of National's Central North Island regional organisation, and two years as the Central North Island Regional Policy Chair.

Member of Parliament

In government, 2008–2017
In the 2008 election, Macindoe won the Hamilton West electorate by a margin of 1,618 votes, defeating incumbent Labour MP Martin Gallagher.

During his first term within Parliament, Macindoe was the Deputy Chair of the  Regulations Review Select Committee, and a member of the Social Services Select Committee. In his first term, he was the Co-Chair of the Caucus Education Committee, and a member of several other caucus committees.

In the 2011 New Zealand general election, Macindoe again won Hamilton West, defeating Labour Party list MP Sue Moroney by a margin of 4,418 votes. In 2013, he was selected as the National Party's Junior Whip, being joined by Third Whip Jami-Lee Ross and Chief Whip Louise Upston.

In the 2014 New Zealand general election, Macindoe retained Hamilton West, defeating Moroney with a majority of 5,784 votes. Following the 2014 election, he was named as the National Party's Senior Whip.

During Prime Minister Bill English's second ministerial reshuffle in April 2017, Macindoe was appointed as Minister of Customs, Associate Minister of Education and Associate Minister of Transport.

In Opposition, 2017–2020
In the 2017 New Zealand general election, Macindoe won Hamilton West by a margin of 7,731 votes, defeating Labour candidate Dr Gaurav Sharma. Following the formation of the Sixth Labour Government in October 2017, Macindoe was appointed the party's spokesperson for ACC, seniors and civil defense.

In late April 2020, Macindoe drew media attention and public criticism when he joked about pushing women off balconies during a live-stream session of the  Justice select committee during the COVID-19 pandemic in New Zealand. Macindoe subsequently apologized for his remarks but insisted he was joking.

At the 2020 general election, Macindoe was defeated in Hamilton West by Labour's Gaurav Sharma by a margin of 6,267 votes. At number 23 on the National Party list, Macindoe was ranked too low to return to Parliament on the party list.

Personal life and community involvement
He is married to Anne Macindoe, and they have two daughters. Outside Parliament, Macindoe is a parishioner at Holy Trinity Anglican Church, Forest Lake; and he is actively involved with a large number of organisations within his electorate including Orchestra Central Trustee, Waikato Chamber of Commerce, Hamilton Citizens' Band Society Vice-President, Epilepsy Waikato Charitable Trust (Patron), and NZ Agricultural Fieldays Society.

Macindoe served on the boards of two local schools. Subsequently, he was chairperson of Waikato Diocesan School's PTA for four years. For nearly five years he served as a trustee for Free FM (Waikato's access radio station). He also participated on the committee that planned Hamilton's 150th anniversary celebrations in 2014. Previously, he chaired the Waikato/Bay of Plenty Regional Orchestra Steering Committee, and he served on the steering committee that culminated in the establishment of Sistema Waikato. He was a supporter of the Hamilton Hydrotherapy Pool Trust and dyed his hair blue in a successful fundraiser for the project in 2008.

Political views

Smacking
Macindoe opposed the Crimes (Abolition of Force as a Justification for Child Discipline) Amendment Bill and supported the "no" vote in the corporal punishment referendum, 2009.

Same-sex marriage
Macindoe opposed the Marriage (Definition of Marriage) Amendment Act 2013, which legalized same-sex marriage in New Zealand. In Parliament, Macindoe cited his committed Christian beliefs in supporting his position, arguing that same-sex relationships could "never be regarded as true marriage" because they were "intrinsically different", and that "the nature of marriage should not be interfered with".

Euthanasia
MacIndoe voted against the End of Life Choice Act 2019 at all three readings.

Abortion
MacIndoe voted against the Abortion Legislation Act 2020 at all three readings.

References

External links
Official website
Parliamentary page
National Party website

1961 births
Living people
New Zealand National Party MPs
University of Otago alumni
University of Waikato alumni
United New Zealand politicians
Unsuccessful candidates in the 1996 New Zealand general election
New Zealand MPs for North Island electorates
Members of the New Zealand House of Representatives
Unsuccessful candidates in the 1999 New Zealand general election
Unsuccessful candidates in the 2002 New Zealand general election
Unsuccessful candidates in the 2005 New Zealand general election
21st-century New Zealand politicians
Candidates in the 2017 New Zealand general election
Candidates in the 2020 New Zealand general election
Unsuccessful candidates in the 2020 New Zealand general election